Trachyphloeus scabriculus is a species of weevil native to Europe.

References

External links
Images representing Trachyphloeus at BOLD

Curculionidae
Beetles described in 1771
Beetles of Europe
Taxa named by Carl Linnaeus